The Lost Woman (French: La femme perdue) is a 1942 French drama film directed by Jean Choux and starring Renée Saint-Cyr, Jean Murat and Jean Galland.

The film's sets were designed by the art director Roland Quignon.

Cast
 Renée Saint-Cyr as Marie Vidal
 Jean Murat as Jean Dubart
 Jean Galland as Pierre
 Roger Duchesne as L'abbé
 Marguerite Pierry as Tante Sophie
 Pierre Labry as Le cabaretier
 Frédéric Mariotti as 	Martin 
 Lise Florelly as La cuisinière
 France Ellys as 	Madame Vidal
 Lina Roxa as 	La cabaretière
 Jean Rigaux as 	Le père Grabouille
 Georges Guétary as Le chanteur à la fête 
 Violette France as Madeleine
 Clary Monthal as La bonne
 René Bourbon as Lautier
 Monique Dubois as 	Jeannette 
 Myno Burney as Adrienne
 Catherine Fonteney as 	Madame Valin
 Albert Broquin as Le clochard 
 Marfa d'Hervilly as 	La dame curieuse
 Maxime Fabert as Le contrôleur

References

Bibliography 
 Billard, Pierre. L'âge classique du cinéma français: du cinéma parlant à la Nouvelle Vague. Flammarion, 1995.
 Burch, Noël & Sellier, Geneviève. The Battle of the Sexes in French Cinema, 1930–1956. Duke University Press, 2013.
 Rège, Philippe. Encyclopedia of French Film Directors, Volume 1. Scarecrow Press, 2009.

External links 
 

1942 films
French drama films
1942 drama films
1940s French-language films
Films directed by Jean Choux
French black-and-white films
1940s French films